Franca Bettoia (or Bettoja; born 14 May 1936) is an Italian actress.

Life and career
Born in Rome, she made her first film appearance in Un palco all'opera (1955, by  Siro Marcellini). The following year she appeared in Los amantes del desierto ("Desert Warrior", a Spanish-Italian desert epic starring Ricardo Montalbán, Carmen Sevilla and Gino Cervi. She next appeared opposite Pietro Germi in L'uomo di paglia  (1958), and opposite Macha Méril and Jacques Charrier in the French production La main chaude (1960, by Gérard Oury). She appeared as a nun in  Apocalisse sul fiume giallo (The Dam on the Yellow River, 1960), an anti-Communist propaganda film which portrays the victory of Mao Zedong's People's Liberation Army as seen through the eyes of an American journalist (Georges Marchal) reporting from the side of the nationalists. In 1961, she starred opposite Alan Ladd in Orazi e Curiazi (Duel of the Champions), a sword and sandals adventure set in ancient Rome.

In 1964, Bettoia co-starred with Vincent Price in the horror/science fiction film The Last Man on Earth (1964, by Ubaldo Ragone and Sidney Salkow), the first screen adaptation of Richard Matheson's novel I Am Legend. She then played a princess in the adventure films Sandokan to the Rescue (1964) and Sandokan Against the Leopard of Sarawak (1964). In 1967 she appeared as Ugo Tognazzi’s lover in the comedy Il fischio al naso (The Seventh Floor, 1967). Bettoia and Tognazzi married in 1972. They had a daughter, film director Maria Sole Tognazzi.

Bettoia acted in only three more films after Il fischio al naso. In the comedy Riusciranno i nostri eroi a ritrovare l'amico misteriosamente scomparso in Africa? (1968, by Ettore Scola) she starred alongside Alberto Sordi and Bernard Blier. In Touche pas à la femme blanche (Don’t Touch the White Woman), directed by Marco Ferreri in 1974) she starred alongside Catherine Deneuve, Marcello Mastroianni and Michel Piccoli. Her last film, Teste rasate (1993) is a drama about skinheads, in which her son, Gianmarco Tognazzi, plays the lead role.

In 1975, Franca Bettoia and her mother Maris founded the Gran Loggia Femminile d'Italia, the first Italian Masonic obedience exclusively for women which was officially recognized by the Grand Orient of Italy.

Selected filmography
Desert Warrior (1957)
The Last Man on Earth (1964)
 Sandokan to the Rescue (1964)
 Sandokan Against the Leopard of Sarawak (1964)

References

External links

1936 births
Living people
Actresses from Rome